Kot Sultan railway station is  located in Kot Sultan, a town in Layyah District of Punjab, Pakistan.

See also
 List of railway stations in Pakistan
 Pakistan Railways

References

External links

Railway stations in Layyah District
Railway stations on Kotri–Attock Railway Line (ML 2)